The following is a partial list of highways numbered 43.

International
 Asian Highway 43
 European route E43

Australia 
  - Mwy Link Road, Pacific Highway, New England Highway

Burma
National Road 43 (Burma)

Canada 
 Alberta Highway 43
 British Columbia Highway 43
 Saskatchewan Highway 43

Hungary
 Main road 43 (Hungary)

India 
  National Highway 43 (India)

Iran
 Road 43

Japan
 Japan National Route 43

Korea, South
 National Route 43

Mexico
Mexican Federal Highway 43

New Zealand
 New Zealand State Highway 43

Thailand
  Thailand Route 43 (Songkhla–Pattani)

United Kingdom
 British A43

United States 
 Interstate 43
 U.S. Route 43
 Alabama State Route 43 (former)
 Arkansas Highway 43
 California State Route 43
 Connecticut Route 43
 Florida State Road 43
 County Road 43 (Manatee County, Florida)
 Georgia State Route 43
 Georgia State Route 43 (former)
 Idaho State Highway 43
 Illinois Route 43
 Indiana State Road 43
 K-43 (Kansas highway)
 Kentucky Route 43
 Louisiana Highway 43
 Maine State Route 43
 Maryland Route 43
 Massachusetts Route 43
 M-43 (Michigan highway)
 Minnesota State Highway 43
 Mississippi Highway 43
 Missouri Route 43
 Montana Highway 43
 Nebraska Highway 43
 Nebraska Spur 43A
 Nevada State Route 43 (former)
 New Hampshire Route 43
 New Jersey Route 43 (former)
 County Route 43 (Monmouth County, New Jersey)
 New York State Route 43
County Route 43B (Cayuga County, New York)
 County Route 43 (Chautauqua County, New York)
 County Route 43 (Dutchess County, New York)
 County Route 43 (Erie County, New York)
 County Route 43 (Genesee County, New York)
 County Route 43 (Lewis County, New York)
 County Route 43 (Madison County, New York)
 County Route 43 (Ontario County, New York)
 County Route 43 (Otsego County, New York)
 County Route 43 (Putnam County, New York)
 County Route 43 (Rensselaer County, New York)
 County Route 43 (Saratoga County, New York)
 County Route 43 (Schenectady County, New York)
 County Route 43 (St. Lawrence County, New York)
 County Route 43 (Suffolk County, New York)
 County Route 43 (Sullivan County, New York)
 County Route 43 (Tioga County, New York)
 County Route 43 (Ulster County, New York)
 County Route 43 (Washington County, New York)
 North Carolina Highway 43
 North Dakota Highway 43
 Ohio State Route 43
 Oklahoma State Highway 43
 Oregon Route 43
 Pennsylvania Route 43
 South Dakota Highway 43
 Tennessee State Route 43
 Texas State Highway 43
 Texas State Highway Loop 43
 Farm to Market Road 43
 Texas Park Road 43
 Utah State Route 43
 Virginia State Route 43
 West Virginia Route 43
 Wisconsin Highway 43 (former)

See also
A43 (disambiguation)#Roads